Yi Wei-chen (born 28 August 1988) is a Taiwanese athlete who specialises in the sprinting events. He represented his country at the 2010 World Indoor Championships and 2011 World Championships.

Competition record

Personal bests
Outdoor
100 metres – 10.28 (+1.2 m/s, Taipei City 2012) 
200 metres – 20.91 (+1.3 m/s, Kaohsiung City 2012)
Indoor
60 metres – 6.96 (Doha 2010)

References

1988 births
Living people
Taiwanese male sprinters
Asian Games medalists in athletics (track and field)
Athletes (track and field) at the 2006 Asian Games
Athletes (track and field) at the 2010 Asian Games
World Athletics Championships athletes for Chinese Taipei
Asian Games silver medalists for Chinese Taipei
Medalists at the 2010 Asian Games